Cherkasy Castle is a former medieval wooden castle in Cherkasy, Ukraine built as a defense against enemies of the Golden Horde and later against Turks and Crimean Tatars.

The city of Cherkasy grew up around the castle. The wooden castle was rebuilt in 1549. Today traces of the castle no longer exist.

The structure of the castle

The walls were built of oak and pine logs, placed vertically and very tightly filled with earth. At the corners of 4 pine towers were large-caliber guns, made in Cherkasy in 1532.

The castle was located within the modern square of Bohdan Khmelnytsky, on Castle Hill. At that time, Kyiv region was under the rule of Lithuania, and Cherkasy was owned by Skirgaila. The walls of which stretched along the hem of the modern .

The castle had barns, stables, barns, a house for the elderly, rooms for guests, a house for the castle staff, two pubs, a prison and a church. It was surrounded by a wide moat. The city of Cherkasy itself was built on both sides of the castle which had a fortification and a prison with two gates.

Site today

The square is equipped with footpaths, lighting and park benches. At the entrance to the park there is a stele with the image of Bohdan Khmelnytsky in honor of the 325th anniversary of the reunification of Ukraine with Russia. In the center is a monument to a prominent Cossack ataman, and short-lived Voivode (Prince) of Moldavia, Ioan Potcoavă.

See also

List of castles in Ukraine

References 

Castles in Ukraine
Castles
15th-century establishments in Ukraine